Jurilovca (Unirea from 1983 to 1996) is a commune in Tulcea County, Northern Dobruja, Romania. It is composed of three villages: Jurilovca, Vișina and Sălcioara (Caramanchioi until 1934; Vintilă Brătianu from 1934 to 1947; 6 Martie from 1947 to 1996).

It was founded by Lipovans at the beginning of the 19th century; the first documentary attestation is from 1826. Although at its beginnings it was a small village, the settlement grew and become, at the end of the 19th century, an important fishing centre in Danube Delta area. Nowadays it has the biggest community of fishermen in Romania, and it has the most modern fish processing factory in the country and Eastern Europe.

Jurilovca is also a tourist center. At about 15 km across the Golovița Lake is Gura Portiței, a beach resort at Black Sea. You can reach there by little vessel and by boat. Other tourist attractions are Argamum Citadel  and Doloșman Cape. The entire area is a part of Danube Delta  Biosphere Reservation.

At the 2011 census, 60.7% of the inhabitants were Romanians and 38.8% Russian Lipovans.

The Lipovans are Russians by ethnicity and Old Believers Orthodox by confession. This confession is the result of Nikonite Reform. In 1652, Nikon, the Patriarch of Russian Orthodox Church, initiated a religious reform which had in view adaptation of Russian Church at the rest of the Orthodox Churches, in fact a formal reform. The result was the division of Russian society in two: Nikonites, those who accepted the Reform, and Starovers (Old Believers), those who did not accept the Reform. The last ones, being chased, emigrated outside Russia, a part of them arriving on Romanian territory, north of Moldavia and Dobruja.

See also
Argamum (castra)

References

Communes in Tulcea County
Localities in Northern Dobruja
Place names of Slavic origin in Romania